Harry Howard may refer to:

 Harry Howard (cricketer) (1885–1960), Australian cricketer
 Harry Howard (footballer, born 1871) (1871–?), English footballer
 Harry Howard (Australian footballer) (1873–1945), Australian rules footballer
 Harry Howard (landscape architect) (1930–2000), Australian landscape architect
 Harry Howard (musician), Australian bass guitarist
 Harry Howard (mayor) (1890–1970), mayor of Perth, Australia

See also
 Henry Howard (disambiguation)
 Harold Howard (disambiguation)